NMS Mărăști was one of four s ordered by Romania shortly before the beginning of the First World War from Italy. All four sister ships were requisitioned when Italy joined the war in 1915. Originally named Vijelie by the Romanians, she was renamed Sparviero in Italian service. Not completed until mid-1917, the ship engaged Austro-Hungarian ships in the Adriatic Sea only twice before the war ended in November 1918. She was given a new name as Mărăști when she was re-purchased by the Romanians in 1920.

After the Axis invasion of the Soviet Union on 22 June 1941 (Operation Barbarossa), Mărăști took part in the Raid on Constanța a few days later and may have damaged a Soviet destroyer leader during the battle. The powerful Soviet Black Sea Fleet heavily outnumbered Axis naval forces in the Black Sea and the Romanian destroyers were limited to escort duties in the western half of the Black Sea during the war. In early 1944 the Soviets were able to cut off and surround the port of Sevastopol on the Crimean Peninsula; during this time the ship escorted convoys evacuating Axis troops from the port before she ran aground in April. Mărăști saw no further action as she was being repaired.

Later that year Romania switched sides, but despite that the Soviets seized the Romanian ships and incorporated them into the Soviet Navy. Renamed Lovkiy, the ship only served for a year before she was returned to the Romanians who redesignated her as D12 in 1952. The ship was discarded in 1961 and subsequently scrapped.

Design and description

The Vifor-class destroyers were ordered in 1913 by Romania from the Pattison Shipyard in Italy, as part of the 1912 Naval Program. They were to be armed with three  guns, four  guns, five  torpedo tubes and have a 10-hour endurance at full speed. Three ships had been laid down by the time Italy joined the Allied side in World War I on 23 May 1915 by declaring war on the Austro-Hungarian Empire. The Italians requisitioned the Romanian ships on 5 June, redesignating them as Aquila-class scout cruisers (esploratori). By this time Vijelie approximately 50 percent complete and was renamed Sparviero.

Their crew numbered 9 officers and 137 sailors. The ships were powered by two Tosi steam turbines, each driving a single propeller, using steam provided by five Thornycroft boilers.

The Italians initially intended to arm the ships with seven 120 mm guns and two pairs of twin mounts for 45 cm torpedo tubes, but they changed the gun armament to three  and four 76 mm weapons to outgun their nearest Austro-Hungarian equivalents, the Admiral Spaun and  scout cruisers. Two of the 152 mm guns were mounted side-by-side on the forecastle and the third gun was mounted on the aft superstructure. The 76 mm anti-aircraft (AA) guns were positioned two on each broadside. The torpedo mounts were abreast the middle funnel, one on each broadside. Sparviero could carry 44 mines.

Construction and service
Sparviero was laid down on 29 January 1914 by Pattison in its Naples shipyard. She was launched on 25 March 1917 and commissioned on 15 July 1917. On the night of 29/30 September, the ship led seven destroyers that put to sea to support an aerial bombardment of the Austro-Hungarian naval base at Pola when they encountered a force of four Austro-Hungarian destroyers and four torpedo boats on a similar mission against an Italian airbase. Sparviero was hit five times, but only three men were wounded, and one Italian destroyer was hit. As the Austro-Hungarians retreated towards the shelter of their minefields, the Italians crippled the destroyer  and set her on fire. Another destroyer took her in tow and both sides returned to port after an inconclusive exchange of fire inside the minefields later that night.

Sparviero and her sister  escorted a force of destroyers and smaller vessels as they bombarded Grisolera on 19 December. Sparviero, together with Aquila and their sister Nibbio, was protecting the recovery of a broken-down flying boat in the Gulf of Drin when they spotted three Austro-Hungarian torpedo boats sweeping mines on 5 September 1918. The sisters opened fire and damaged 86 F before the torpedo boats reached the shelter of Medua's coastal artillery. The following month, they escorted Allied ships as they bombarded Durazzo, Albania, on 2 October. The trio then covered the ships bombarding Medua, Albania, on 21 October.

Sparviero and Nibbio were re-purchased by Romania in 1920. Sparviero became Mărăști and Nibbio was renamed Mărășești when they were commissioned after arriving in Romania on 1 July 1920. The ships were formally re-classified as destroyers and assigned to the newly formed Counter-torpedo Division which was renamed as the Destroyer Squadron on 1 April 1927. The sisters were sent to Italy in 1925–1926 for a refit where they had their 152 mm guns replaced by two twin-gun 120 mm Schneider-Canet-Armstrong 1918/19 turrets, one each fore and aft of the superstructure, and a fifth gun on a platform amidships. The aft 76 mm guns removed during this time. Fire-control systems were fitted the following year. The Squadron was visited by King Carol II of Romania and the Prime Minister, Nicolae Iorga, on 27 May 1931. By 1940, the midships 120 mm gun had been replaced by a pair of twin-gun French Hotchkiss  anti-aircraft machinegun mounts and the remaining 76 mm guns by a pair of German  SK C/30 AA guns. Depth charge racks had been fitted on the stern and an Italian depth charge thrower was added. The ships could carry 40 depth charges or 50 mines.

World War II

The Romanians were expecting a Soviet raid and their defences, consisting of Mărăști, the destroyer  and the heavy guns of the German coastal artillery battery Tirpitz, were prepared to engage the Soviet ships. In ten minutes, starting from 03:58, Moskva and Kharkov fired no less than 350 shells from their  guns. The two Soviet ships were silhouetted against the dawn while the Romanian ships were hidden by the coast behind them. The heavy and accurate Axis fire caused Moskva and Kharkov to begin to withdraw while laying down a smoke screen. As they retreated they entered a Romanian minefield and Moskva sank after striking a mine.

Massively outnumbered by the Black Sea Fleet, the Romanian ships were kept behind the minefields defending Constanța for several months after the start of the war. They spent that time training for convoy escort operations. Beginning on 5 October, the Romanians began laying minefields to defend the route between the Bosphorus and Constanța; the minelayers were protected by the destroyers. After the evacuation of Odessa on 16 October, the Romanians began to clear the Soviet mines defending the port and to lay their own minefields protecting the route between Constanța and Odessa. During the winter of 1941–1942, the Romanian destroyers were primarily occupied with escorting convoys between the Bosporus and Constanța. On 1 December Mărăști, Regina Maria and her sister  were escorting a convoy to Odessa when a submarine unsuccessfully attacked them. It was quickly spotted and depth charged by Regina Maria and Regele Ferdinand with the latter claiming a kill. Soviet records, however, do not acknowledge any losses on that date.

On 20 April 1942, after the ice had melted, Mărăști, Mărășești and Regina Maria escorted the first convoy to Ochakov, although the Romanian destroyers were generally used to escort ships between the Bosporus and Constanța. After Sevastopol surrendered on 4 July, a direct route between the port and Constanța was opened in October and operated year-round. Mărăști and Mărășești and two gunboats were escorting a convoy of three cargo ships on 7 July 1943 when they were attacked by a small wolfpack of three submarines.  fired six torpedoes at one of the gunboats and a freighter and missed with all of them. Mărășești depth charged one of the submarines and claimed to have sunk it, but no submarines were lost by the Soviets that day. On the night of 9/10 November, the sisters escorted minelayers as they laid a minefield off Sevastopol.

At some point during the war, the ship's anti-aircraft armament was augmented with two additional 3.7 cm SK C/30 and four  AA guns.

Successful Soviet attacks in early 1944 cut the overland connection of the Crimea with the rest of Ukraine and necessitated its supply by sea. In early April another offensive occupied most of the peninsula and encircled Sevastopol. The Romanians began evacuating the city on 14 April, with their destroyers covering the troop convoys. Mărăști ran aground later that month and was under repair for the rest of the war.

After King Michael's Coup on 23 August, Romania declared war on the Axis Powers. Mărăști remained in harbour until she was seized by the Soviets on 5 September together with the rest of the Romanian Navy. Renamed Lovkiy on 20 October, the ship was commissioned into the Soviet Navy as part of the Black Sea Fleet, along with her sister, on 14 September. They were returned to Romania on 12 October 1945 where they resumed their former names. The sisters were then assigned to the Destroyer Squadron before beginning an overhaul. When the Destroyer Division was redesignated as the 418th Destroyer Division in 1952, Mărăști was renamed D12. The ship continued to serve until April 1961, when she was discarded and subsequently scrapped.

Notes

Citations

Bibliography

External links
 Sparviero Marina Militare website

Cruisers of the Regia Marina
Ships built in Naples
1917 ships
Destroyers of the Soviet Navy
World War II destroyers of Romania
World War II destroyers of the Soviet Union
Captured ships
Mărăști-class destroyers